The Dudu Akaibe's pygmy shrew (Sylvisorex akaibei) is a species of mammal in the family Soricidae. It is found in the Democratic Republic of the Congo.

References

Sylvisorex
Mammals described in 2009